This is a list of international presidential trips made by Lula da Silva, the 39th and current President of Brazil. Lula has made 2 international trips to 3 countries during his second presidency so far, which began on January 1, 2023.

Summary
The number of visits per country where President Lula traveled  in his second presidency are:
 One: Argentina, Uruguay, United States

2023

Future trips
The following international trips are scheduled to be made by Lula:

Multilateral meetings
Multilateral meetings of the following intergovernmental organizations are scheduled to take place during Lula's term in office.

References

Luiz Inácio Lula da Silva
Foreign relations of Brazil
2023 in international relations
21st century in international relations
Lists of 21st-century trips
Luiz Inácio Lula da Silva
Brazil diplomacy-related lists
Luiz Inácio Lula da Silva